Taylor's short-legged skink (Brachymeles vermis) is a species of skink endemic to the Philippines.

References

Reptiles of the Philippines
Reptiles described in 1918
Brachymeles
Taxa named by Edward Harrison Taylor